Alexander Theo Linnet (born 4 April 1988 in Copenhagen, Denmark), performing under his mononym Xander, is a Danish pop singer and songwriter. Xander is the son of singer Anne Linnet and Mads Buhl Nielsen. He is signed to the ArtPeople record label.

He debuted with the hit single "Det burde ikk være sådan her" (meaning "It should not be like this" in Danish) in September 2010, making to the top of the Danish charts selling over 30,000 copies. Xander released his debut album, Over skyer, under vand (meaning "Above clouds, under water" in Danish) on 28 February 2011.

Discography

Albums

Singles

Featured singles

References

External links
Facebook

1988 births
Living people
Musicians from Copenhagen
21st-century Danish  male singers